Way for a Sailor is a 1930 American Pre-Code film starring John Gilbert. The supporting cast includes Wallace Beery, Jim Tully, Leila Hyams, and Polly Moran.  The film was directed by Sam Wood, who insisted on no screen credit. The film is reputed to be so bad that the studio might have used it to sabotage leading man Gilbert's career in the sound era due to animosity from Louis B. Mayer. MGM produced a Spanish language version of this film, Love in Every Port, starring Jose Crespo and Conchita Montenegro.

Cast
John Gilbert as Jack
Wallace Beery as Tripod
Jim Tully as Ginger
Leila Hyams as Joan
Polly Moran as Polly
Doris Lloyd as Flossy

Opening captions
"THE MERCHANT MARINE — — Afloat....a sweating loyal crew transporting food, machinery, mail, medicines, the very needs of life....to half of the world.Ashore....a rollicking, pay-spending, 'Love 'em and Leave 'em' gang."

"FIRE! A LONE FIGHT! MID-OCEAN! Land a thousand miles back! A thousand miles ahead! A thousand fathoms down!"

References

External links
 

1930 films
American black-and-white films
Films directed by Sam Wood
1930 romantic drama films
Metro-Goldwyn-Mayer films
American romantic drama films
Films with screenplays by Charles MacArthur
American multilingual films
1930 multilingual films
1930s English-language films
1930s American films